Fred or Frederic Shields may refer to:

Fred Shields (soccer) (1912–1985), American soccer player born Fred Zbikowski
Fred J. Shields, American minister, academic, and educator
Frederic Shields (1833–1911), English artist and designer
Fred Shields (1904–1974), actor best known for voicing the Great Prince of the Forest in Disney's Bambi